The Tunisia women's national under-17 football team, nicknamed Les Aigles de Carthage (The Eagles of Carthage or The Carthage Eagles), is the national team of Tunisia and is controlled by the Tunisian Football Federation. The team competes in the African U-17 Cup of Nations for Women and the FIFA U-17 Women's World Cup.

History

Results and fixtures
The following is a list of match results in the last 12 months, as well as any future matches that have been scheduled.

Legend

2023

Coaching staff

Current coaching staff

Manager history
 Samir Landolsi ( – )

Current squad
The following players were named to the roster for the---.

Competitive record
 Champions   Runners-up   Third place   Fourth place  

Red border color indicates tournament was held on home soil.

FIFA U-17 Women's World Cup

African U-17 Cup of Nations for Women record

Arab U-17 Women's Cup

Honours

See also
Tunisia women's national football team
Tunisia women's national under-20 football team
Tunisian Football Federation

External links
Official website
FIFA profile

Arabic women's national under-17 association football teams
National
Women's national under-17 association football teams
U